The Laučynė Landscape Sanctuary is a protected area of a state importance in Josvainiai Eldership of Kėdainiai District Municipality, in central Lithuania. It encompasses a part of the Pernarava-Šaravai Forest with the Žvaranta river.

The aim of the sanctuary is to protect a typical landscape of the Nevėžis Plain covered by forest. Mixed forests predominate in the sanctuary, with small-leaved lime and hornbeam tree groups. Rare wild garlic and common ivy grow in the forest. There are crane nesting places.  

The Šaravai Oak Tree (a nature monument) grows in the Laučynė Landscape Sanctuary.

References

Protected areas in Kėdainiai District Municipality
1992 establishments in Lithuania